
Hübner is a Germanic surname, sometimes spelled Huebner or Hubner.

The name means an agricultural worker, a farmer, possibly and specifically one who worked a "hube", which was a piece of land roughly equivalent to the English measurement of a "hide", about 120 acres. The appearance of this surname is attributed to medieval feudal Germany.

Notable people with this surname include:

Academics
 Arthur Hübner, German philologist
 Chris Huebner, Canadian Mennonite theologian
 Emil Hübner (1834–1901), German classical scholar, son of Julius Hübner
 Franz Hübner (1846–1877), German entomologist
 Hans Hübner (1837-1884), German chemist
 Jacob Hübner, (1761–1826), German entomologist
 Johann Hübner (1668–1731), German geographer and scholar
 Robert Hübner (born 1948), German chess grandmaster and papyrologist
 Sabine Renate Hübner (born 1976), German professor of ancient history

Artists
 Julius Hübner (1806–1882), German painter, father of Emil Hübner
 Karl Hübner (1814–1879), German painter
 Mentor Huebner (1917–2001), American storyboard artist
 Ulrich Hübner (1872–1932), German painter

Military personnel
 Alfred Hübner (1891–?), German World War I flying ace
 Clarence R. Huebner, American lieutenant general
 Rudolf Hübner, German World War II general

Performers
 Bruno Hübner (1899–1983), Austrian actor
 Charly Hübner (born 1972), German actor
 Christian Hübner (born 1977), German opera bass
 Fritz Hübner (born 1933), German opera bass
 Herbert Hübner (1889–1972), German actor
 Karin Hübner (1936-2005), German actress
 Ralf Hübner, German percussionist
 Zygmunt Hübner (1930-1989), Polish actor and director

Politicians
 Danuta Hübner, European Commissioner for Regional Policy
 David Huebner, American lawyer and U.S. ambassador to New Zealand and Samoa
 Johannes Hübner, Austrian politician
 John Hubner (1840–1920), American politician and real estate developer
 Jorge Hübner, Chilean politician
 Count Joseph Alexander Hübner (1811–1892), Austrian diplomat, real name Josef Hafenbredl

Sportspeople
 Andrea Hübner (born 1957), German swimmer
 Benjamin Hübner (born 1989), German football player
 Christopher Hübner, German footballer
 Dario Hübner, Italian footballer
 Florian Hübner, German footballer
 Frank Hübner (born 1950), German sailor
 Johan Hübner von Holst (1881–1945), Swedish sport shooter
 Michael Hübner (born 1959), German sprint track cyclist
 Ramon Menezes Hubner (born 1972), Brazilian footballer
 Rudi Hübner, German footballer
 Rudolf Hübner (athlete), Czech athlete
 Stefan Hübner (born 1975), German volleyball player
 Wolfgang Hübner, German weightlifter

Writers
 Andrew Huebner, American author
 Sara Hübner de Fresno, Chilean author

Others
 Berna Huebner, Filmmaker and Alzheimer's advocate
 George Huebner (1910–1996), American automotive engineer
 Martin Hübner (1723-1795), Danish jurist
 Robert Huebner (1924–1998), American physician

See also

 Hübener

References  

German-language surnames